Marion Body (born c. 1960) is a retired American football cornerback. He played for the University of Michigan from 1979 to 1982 and in the USFL for the Michigan Panthers in 1983.  A native of Detroit, Michigan, Body attended Kettering High School.  He enrolled at the University of Michigan and played football under head coach Bo Schembechler from 1979 to 1982.   In four years playing football for the Michigan Wolverines, Body was credited with 117 tackles and 7 interceptions.  He had two interceptions in Michigan's 1980 game against Notre Dame.  Body played professional football for the Michigan Panthers in the USFL.

References

Living people
Michigan Panthers players
Michigan Wolverines football players
Kettering High School alumni
Players of American football from Detroit
Year of birth missing (living people)